Katalin Hemrik (18 November 1941 – 8 March 1988) was a Hungarian cross-country skier. She competed in two events at the 1964 Winter Olympics.

References

External links
 

1941 births
1988 deaths
Hungarian female cross-country skiers
Olympic cross-country skiers of Hungary
Cross-country skiers at the 1964 Winter Olympics
Skiers from Budapest